The small blue (Cupido minimus) is a Palearctic butterfly in the family Lycaenidae. Despite its common name, it is not particularly blue. The male has some bluish suffusion at the base of its upper wings but is mostly dark brown like the female. The species can live in colonies of up to several hundred and in its caterpillar stage is cannibalistic.

Description

Small blue males are dark brown with a scattering of bright blue scales that speckle their wings. Females lack this blue speckling. Both males and females exhibit the characteristic silver underside with black spots. The male has a bluish tint at the base of its wings similar to the upper side.  Their wingspan can fall anywhere from 16-27mm, but males tend to be the smaller sex. Small blues are often confused with the female Osiris Blue, whose coloring is similar to that of the male small blue.

Geographic range
C. minimus is found in Europe, Asia Minor, Transcaucasia, Tian-Shan, western Siberia, central Siberia, southern Siberia, the Russian Far East, Amur, Mongolia, Magadan and Kamchatka.

UK and Ireland
The small blue is known for being the smallest butterfly found in the United Kingdom.  It has a very patchy distribution across the UK with its strongholds on the chalk and limestone grasslands of southern England such as the Cotswolds and Salisbury Plain. Across the rest of Great Britain and Ireland it is often associated with coastal habitats with widely scattered colonies in northern England and the far north of Scotland. It is a Priority Species for conservation in Northern Ireland and under the UK Biodiversity Action Plan.

Habitat
C. minimus live in calcareous grasslands, abandoned quarries, railway and embankments and woodland edges and clearings.

Food resources 
Recorded larval food plants are Oxytropis campestris, Astragalus alpinus, Lotus corniculatus, Anthyllis vulneraria, Melilotus, Coronilla, Medicago, Anthyllis vulneraria, Astragalus glycyphyllos and Astragalus cicer.

In the UK, small blues lay their eggs, live, and feed exclusively on the kidney vetch. While females obtain all of their nutrients from plants, males will extract salts and minerals from carrion, dung, and mud puddles.

Mating
When courting, males will find a perch on a covered piece of grass or shrub while waiting for females. During this period, males are very territorial of their perch. Virgin females flying by will mate with the males without elaborate courtship. Mated females will attempt to avoid other males by waiting in the grasses out of sight when a male is nearby.

Oviposition
After mating, the female will search for a suitable place to lay a single egg, such as a healthy food plant. Once found, she will lay it between two florets on the flower head in order to keep it mostly hidden, and secure the egg. In order to keep other females from laying eggs on the same flower, the female small blue will rub her abdomen against the florets before she leaves to leave a scent marker. The caterpillars are cannibalistic and will eat one another if multiple hatch on the same flower. However, this scent marker will not last more than a few days, so multiple eggs are often found on a plant.

Life cycle

Ovum
Eggs will typically hatch between one and three weeks, depending on location and temperature. They are .40mm in diameter and .2mm in height. The eggs are light green with white reticulations.

Larvae

First instar
Larvae in the 1st instar are typically very pale blue, almost white, with a black head. When the caterpillar first emerges from the egg, it is about .80mm long and will grow to 1.3 mm by the end of the first instar. They have several small hairs along the length of their bodies. Once hatched, the larvae will eat through the calyx of the plant as well as the young green legumes they are typically laid on. The first instar is also cannibalistic, and will feed on any smaller larvae that cross its path.

Second instar
During the second instar, the caterpillar will grow to about 4mm long. Hairs will begin to grow more densely packed. While the head is still black, the main color is very pale yellow. By this point, the larvae has developed a scent gland on the tenth segment that can be seen pulsing while it moves.

Third instar
In this stage, the caterpillars will attack and eat one another. It has more hairs even still and is deeper yellow in color.

Fourth instar
By the fourth instar, the caterpillar is about 1 cm long. They range from pale green to pale yellow, with a dorsal stripe. Come late summer, they will form small cocoons out of silk for hibernation, and will stay motionless for ten months. Their cocoons resemble dead calyces, and thus provide camouflage from predators.

Pupa
The pupa stage can last between 1 and 3 weeks, and is usually temperature dependent. Caterpillars will attach themselves, head up, to the underside of a leaf or blade of grass via a silk cincture that is in turn attached to a silk pad. The pupa is light green in color with brown specks and small hair like structures along the width

Imago
The adult small blue has a lifespan of about three months. In the southern United Kingdom, there are two broods a summer. One is in June, and the other in August with the second brood being smaller. However, in the northern part of the United Kingdom, only the June brood is present. The small blue is diurnal, and often lives in colonies. While most colonies consist of a few dozen individuals, colonies of several hundred have been recorded.

Subspecies
Cupido minimus trinacriae Verity, 1919 Sicily

Conservation status
In recent years, the small blue has lost much of its habitat in the United Kingdom, thus making it a Priority Species for conservation in Northern Ireland and under the UK Biodiversity Action Plan. It is listed under the 41 species of principal importance under the Schedule 5 of the 1981 Wildlife and Countryside Act and the 1985 Northern Ireland Wildlife Order.

See also
List of butterflies of Great Britain

References

Jim Asher et al. The Millennium Atlas of Butterflies of Britain and Ireland. Oxford University Press.

Cupido (butterfly)
Butterflies of Asia
Butterflies of Europe
Insects of Mongolia
Butterflies described in 1775
Endangered biota of Asia
Endangered biota of Europe